JDS Narushio (SS-569) was the fourth boat of thes. She was commissioned on 28 September 1973.

Construction and career
Isoshio was laid down at Mitsubishi Heavy Industries Kobe Shipyard on 9 July 1970 and launched on 18 March 1972. She was commissioned on 25 November 1972, into the 1st Submarine Group.

On 28 September 1973, she was transferred to the 5th Submarine, which was newly commissioned under the 1st Submarine Group, along with JDS Isoshio.

During the Juyu Yomaru incident that occurred on 9 November 1974, the 10th Yuyo Maru, which had fallen into difficulty extinguishing the fire, was dispatched together with JDS Haruna, JDS Takatsuki, JDS Mochizuki and JDS Yukikaze to sink the ship. After arriving at the disposal area on the afternoon of November 28, the submarine launched a salvo of torpedoes and fired four Mk37 torpedoes, but due to mechanical failures, misalignment, and lack of warhead power, the ship failed to sink.

Participated in Hawaii dispatch training from July 24 to October 15, 1976.

Participated in Hawaii dispatch training from January 28 to April 24, 1980.

At around 12:47 pm on March 25, 1982, she ran aground in a shallow water about 3 km north-northwest of the Hesaki Lighthouse at the east exit of the Kanmon Straits due to a mistake in maneuvering while returning to Kure. After 6 pm, she took off on her own due to the rising tide.

On 8 June 1990, she was reclassified to a special service submarine, the ship registration number was changed to ATSS-8002, and it became a ship under the direct control of the 1st submarine group.

She was decommissioned on 17 March 1993.

Citations

1972 ships
Uzushio-class submarines
Ships built by Mitsubishi Heavy Industries